Abdullino (Abdulla) is a rural locality (a village) in Zilim-Karanovsky Selsoviet of Gafuriysky District, Bashkortostan, Russia. The population was 69 as of 2010. There are 2 streets.

Geography 
Abdullino is located 55 km north of Krasnousolsky (the district's administrative centre) by road. Kyzyl Yar is the nearest rural locality.

Ethnicity 
The village is inhabited by Bashkirs and others.

References 

Rural localities in Gafuriysky District